In the tables, the first two columns contain the Chinese character representing the classifier, in traditional and simplified versions when they differ. The next four columns give pronunciations in Standard (Mandarin) Chinese, using pinyin; Cantonese, in Jyutping and Yale, respectively; and Minnan (Taiwan). The last column gives the classifier's literal meaning (in quotes) and principal uses.

Nominal classifiers

Classifiers proper

Measure words/massifiers

Measurement units

Verbal classifiers

See Chinese classifier → Verbal classifiers.

See also 
 Hokkien counter word

References

External links
List of Common Nominal Measure Words on chinesenotes.com
Units of Weights and Measures on chinesenotes.com
兩串蕉一把抓- 我教量詞
量词
现代汉语量词与名词的子类划分

Chinese grammar
Chinese words and phrases
Lists of words